Dalqueich is a hamlet in Perth and Kinross, Scotland.

Warroch House lies about a mile to the west of Dalqueich. It is about twice the size of Hattonburn House, near Milnathort, both houses having been associated with the Montgomery family for many years.

References

Villages in Perth and Kinross